Ecological inheritance is the passing on to descendants of inherited resources and conditions, and associated modified selection pressures, through niche construction. For instance, many organisms build, choose or provision nursery environments, such as nests, for their offspring. The recurrence of traits across life cycles results in part from parents constructing developmental conditions for their descendants. Richard Lewontin stresses how by modifying the availability of biotic and abiotic resources, niche-constructing organisms can cause organisms to coevolve with their environments. 

Ecological inheritance has significant implications for macroevolution. Ancestral species may modify environments through their niche construction that may have consequences for other species, sometimes millions of years later. For instance, cyanobacteria produced oxygen as a waste product of photosynthesis (see great oxygenation event), which dramatically changed the composition of the Earth’s atmosphere and oceans, with vast macroevolutionary consequences.

In recent years, many evolutionary biologists have sought to expand the concept of inheritance within evolutionary biology, and ecological inheritance is now commonly incorporated into these schemes. The evolutionary significance of ecological inheritance, however, remains disputed.

References

Further reading
  Frames ecological inheritance in the broader context of niche inheritance.
  Compares ecological and cultural inheritance.

Ecology
Evolutionary biology
Extended evolutionary synthesis